An Yangfeng (born 1 September 1963) is a Chinese  chess player, who holds the title Woman International Master. She competed in two Women's Interzonal tournaments, at Havana in 1985 and at Smederevska Palanka in 1987.

An was a member of the Chinese national team at the Women's Chess Olympiad four times in 1980−1986. She played a total of 53 games scoring 28 wins, 13 draws, and 12 losses.

An Yangfeng plays for the Guangdong chess club in the China Chess League (CCL).

See also
Chess in China

References

External links

1963 births
Living people
Chinese female chess players
Chess Woman International Masters
Place of birth missing (living people)
20th-century Chinese women